Gohar Jageer  is a village in union council 17-R Usman Wala, tehsil and Kasur district, Punjab province, Pakistan. 

Population is approximately ten thousand, being the largest village population in the union council, with the majority caste being Arain. Nearby villages include Tatara Kamil, Usman wala, Kili Sokal, Mahalam, Noor Pur and Rajowal.

Most occupations are within agriculture and farming, which includes the cultivation of wheat, rice and sugarcane. There is one boys’ primary school and one girls’ primary school. The village is on the bank of the BRB canal, on which is a Rangers checkpost.

References

External links

Kasur District
Populated places in Kasur District